Rodrigo Pérez Gutiérrez (born 17 October 2003) is a Uruguayan footballer who plays as a forward for Plaza Colonia.

Career statistics

Club

Notes

References

2003 births
Living people
Association football forwards
Uruguayan footballers
Uruguayan Primera División players
Club Plaza Colonia de Deportes players